Steven Pierce (born 1949) is an American politician in Massachusetts.

Steven Pierce may also refer to:

Steve Pierce (born 1950), American politician from Arizona
Steve Pierce (American football) (born 1963), American football wide receiver
Stephen Rowland Pierce (1896–1966), architect and town planning consultant

See also
Steve Pearce (disambiguation)
Steve Piearce (born 1974), English footballer
Stephen Pears (born 1962), English footballer